, is a small near-Earth object of the Apollo group. It is currently trapped in a 3:5 mean motion resonance with Venus. The object was first observed on 14 September 2018, by astronomer B. M. Africano with the Mount Lemmon Survey at Mount Lemmon Observatory, Arizona, United States.

Orbit and physical properties 

The asteroid's orbit determination is in need of some improvement. It orbits the Sun at a distance of 0.87–1.17 AU once every 374 days (semi-major axis of 1.016 AU). Its orbit has an eccentricity of 0.1470 and an inclination of 13.35° with respect to the ecliptic. It is a member of Apollo dynamical class in both the JPL Small-Body Database and the Minor Planet Center. Apollo asteroids are Earth-crossing asteroids.

False binary 

This pair of near-Earth objects show the highest observed level of dynamical coherence among the NEO-population.

Physical characteristics 

 has an absolute magnitude of 24.4 which gives a calculated mean diameter between 23 and 103 meters for an assumed geometric albedo of 0.60 and 0.03, respectively.

Notes 

  This is assuming an albedo of 0.60 and 0.03, respectively.

References

External links 
 List Of Apollo Minor Planets (by designation)
 
 
 

Minor planet object articles (unnumbered)
Earth-crossing asteroids
20180914